Phragmites australis, known as the common reed, is a species of plant.

Description

Later the numerous long, narrow, sharp pointed spikelets appear greyer due to the growth of long, silky hairs. These eventually help disperse the minute seeds.

Taxonomy
Recent studies have characterized morphological distinctions between the introduced and native stands of Phragmites australis in North America.

 Phragmites australis subsp. americanus – the North American genotype has been described as a distinct species, Phragmites americanus
 Phragmites australis subsp. australis – the Eurasian genotype
 Phragmites australis subsp. altissimus (Benth.) Clayton
 Phragmites australis var. marsillyanus (Mabille) Kerguélen

Ecology
It is a helophyte (aquatic plant), especially common in alkaline habitats, and it also tolerates brackish water, and so is often found at the upper edges of estuaries and on other wetlands (such as grazing marsh) which are occasionally inundated by the sea. A study demonstrated that P. australis has similar greenhouse gas emissions to native Spartina alterniflora. However, other studies have demonstrated that it is associated with larger methane emissions and greater carbon dioxide uptake than native New England salt marsh vegetation that occurs at higher marsh elevations.

Common reed is suppressed where it is grazed regularly by livestock. Under these conditions it either grows as small shoots within the grassland sward, or it disappears altogether. In Europe, common reed is rarely invasive, except in damp grasslands where traditional grazing has been abandoned.

Invasive status
In North America, the status of Phragmites australis is a source of confusion and debate. It is commonly considered a non-native and often invasive species, introduced from Europe in the 1800s. However, there is evidence of the existence of Phragmites as a native plant in North America long before European colonization of the continent. The North American native subspecies, P. a. subsp. americanus (sometimes considered a separate species, P. americanus), is markedly less vigorous than European forms. The expansion of Phragmites in North America is due to the more vigorous, but similar-looking European subsp. australis.

Phragmites australis subsp. australis outcompetes native vegetation and lowers the local plant biodiversity. It forms dense thickets of vegetation that are unsuitable habitat for native fauna. It displaces native plants species such as wild rice, cattails, and native orchids. Phragmites has a high above ground biomass that blocks light to other plants allowing areas to turn into Phragmites monoculture very quickly. Decomposing Phragmites increases the rate of marsh accretion more rapidly than would occur with native marsh vegetation.

Phragmites australis subsp. australis is causing serious problems for many other North American hydrophyte wetland plants, including the native P. australis subsp. americanus. Gallic acid released by phragmites is degraded by ultraviolet light to produce mesoxalic acid, effectively hitting susceptible plants and seedlings with two harmful toxins. Phragmites is so difficult to control that one of the most effective methods of eradicating the plant is to burn it over 2–3 seasons. The roots grow so deep and strong that one burn is not enough. Ongoing research suggests that goats could be effectively used to control the species.

Natural enemies
Since 2017, over 80% of the beds of Phragmites in the Pass a Loutre Wildlife Management Area have been damaged by the invasive roseau cane scale (Nipponaclerda biwakoensis), threatening wildlife habitat throughout the affected regions of the area. While typically considered a noxious weed, in Louisiana the reed beds are considered critical to the stability of the shorelines of wetland areas and waterways of the Mississippi Delta, and the die-off of reed beds is believed to accelerate coastal erosion.

Uses
The entire plant is edible raw or cooked. The young stems can be boiled, or later on be used to make flour. The underground stems can be used but are tough, as can the seeds but they are hard to find.

Stems can be made into eco-friendly drinking straws. Many parts of the plant can be eaten. The young shoots can be consumed raw or cooked. The hardened sap from damaged stems can be eaten fresh or toasted. The stems can be dried, ground, sifted, hydrated, and toasted like marshmallows. The seeds can be crushed, mixed with berries and water, and cooked to make a gruel. The roots can be prepared similar to those of cattails.

Common Reeds are also the primary source of thatch for traditional thatch housing in Europe and beyond.

The plant is extensively used in phytodepuration, or natural water treatment systems, since the root hairs are excellent at filtering out impurities in waste water. 

Phragmites australis also shows excellent potential as a source of biomass.

References

Further reading

 

Molinieae
Aquatic plants
Edible plants
Halophytes
Flora of Malta
Taxa named by Antonio José Cavanilles